Convicted is a 1938 American/Canadian action film directed by Leon Barsha. It stars Charles Quigley, Marc Lawrence and 19-year-old Rita Hayworth, on the verge of Hollywood stardom. This is the last of the quota quickies made for the British market by producer Kenneth J. Bishop in Victoria, B.C. from 1933 to 1937. The screenplay by Edgar Edwards was based on the Cornell Woolrich story Face Work.

It was later screened at the 1984 Festival of Festivals as part of Front & Centre, a special retrospective program of artistically and culturally significant films from throughout the history of Canadian cinema.

References

External links
Convicted (1938 film) at the Internet Movie Database

1938 films
American crime action films
Films directed by Leon Barsha
1930s crime action films
Films shot in British Columbia
Columbia Pictures films
American black-and-white films
Canadian action films
Canadian black-and-white films
1930s American films
1930s Canadian films